Salvador Agustín Reynoso (born 12 October 1987) was an Argentine footballer.

He played for All Boys, then a Primera B Nacional member in Argentina.

External links
 Profile at BDFA 
 

1987 births
Living people
Argentine footballers
Argentine expatriate footballers
San Lorenzo de Almagro footballers
Unión San Felipe footballers
Argentine Primera División players
Chilean Primera División players
Expatriate footballers in Chile
Association football midfielders
People from General Rodríguez Partido
Sportspeople from Buenos Aires Province